Kristopher Shaun Burton (born 4 August 1980) is an Australian-born Italian international rugby union player. His regular playing positions are Fly-half and Fullback.

Burton plays as a fly-half but can also turn out in the fullback position.

Burton qualifies to play for Italy through his mother, and made his debut for Italy against Uruguay on 2 June 2007. He has not represented Italy in the Rugby World Cup tournament, but has played in the three Six Nations Championships, in 2011, 2012 & 2013.

On 9 April 2013, it was confirmed that Burton would be moving from Treviso to Newport Gwent Dragons for the 2013–14 season.

On 7 May 2013, Burton announced that he would be retiring from International rugby. Burton left the Dragons in July 2014.

References

External links
 
 
 Benetton Treviso profile 

1980 births
Australian emigrants to Italy
Living people
Italian rugby union players
Italy international rugby union players
Rugby union fly-halves
RC Orléans players
Cavalieri Prato players
Benetton Rugby players
Dragons RFC players
Sportsmen from Queensland
Rugby union players from Brisbane